George Doull (25 December 1879 – 13 November 1962) was an Australian rules footballer who played with Geelong in the Victorian Football League (VFL).

Notes

External links 

1879 births
1962 deaths
Australian rules footballers from Victoria (Australia)
Geelong Football Club players
Preston Football Club (VFA) players